is a peninsula on the east coast of Hokkaidō, Japan, with its northwestern base in Shibetsu and southeast tip in Betsukai. The name is derived from the Ainu for jawbone, notkeu (ノッケウ), purportedly due to the landform's visual resemblance to that of a whale. There remain on the peninsula traces of Satsumon culture pit dwellings, while during the Edo period samurai were stationed at a checkpoint controlling the crossing to Kunashiri. Together with Notsuke Bay, Notsuke Peninsula has been designated a Ramsar Site, a Special Wildlife Protection Area, and an Important Bird Area, and forms part of Notsuke-Fūren Prefectural Natural Park.

See also

 List of Ramsar sites in Japan
 Hokkaidō Heritage
 Nemuro Peninsula Chashi Sites

References 

Peninsulas of Japan
Landforms of Hokkaido
Betsukai, Hokkaido
Shibetsu, Hokkaido (town)
Ramsar sites in Japan